is a Portuguese title that may refer to:

People
 John of Portugal (disambiguation), various royals
 Dharmapala of Kotte (1541–1597)

Locations
 One of Lapa, Dom João, and Montanha islands near Macau
 Dom João de Castro Bank, a submarine volcano in the North Atlantic
 Ribeira Dom João, a settlement in Cape Verde